Year 980 (CMLXXX) was a leap year starting on Thursday (link will display the full calendar) of the Julian calendar.

Events 
 By place 
 Europe 
 Peace is concluded between Emperor Otto II (the Red) and King Lothair III (or Lothair IV) at Margut, ending the Franco-German war of 978–980. Lothair renounces his claim on Lower Lorraine, while Otto promises to recognize Lothair's son Louis V as the rightful heir of the West Frankish Kingdom. 
 June 11 – Vladimir I (the Great), grand prince of Kiev, consolidates the Kievan realm from modern Ukraine to the Baltic Sea. Vladimir is proclaimed ruler (knyaz) of all Kievan Rus'.
 Fall – Otto II sets off on his first expedition to Italy. He leaves the government in the hands of Archchancellor Willigis. Otto is accompanied by his wife, Empress Theophanu.
 Winter – Otto II celebrates Christmas with his family at Ravenna. He receives the Iron Crown of Lombardy as the King of Italy.
 King Harald Bluetooth orders the construction of the Viking ring fortress of Trelleborg (modern Denmark).

 England 
 Viking raids from Scandinavia threaten the southern English coast after a pause of 25 years. Hampshire and the Isle of Thanet are ravaged.

 Arabian Empire 
 The Dari dialect (which will become the major language of Persia) is developed in the royal courts of the Samanid Empire in Central Asia.

 Africa 
 The Kilwa Sultanate, centered at Kilwa (an island off modern Tanzania), is founded by Ali ibn al-Hassan Shirazi, Persian prince of Shiraz.

 By topic 
 Religion 
 Notker (or Notger), Frankish Benedictine monk and bishop, founds the Prince-Bishopric of Liège (modern Belgium) which will remain an independent state inside the Holy Roman Empire for more than 800 years.

Births 
 July 5 – Mokjong, king of Goryeo (Korea) (d. 1009)
 July 15 – Ichijō, emperor of Japan (d. 1011)
 Abu Mansur al-Baghdadi, Persian scholar (d. 1037)
 Abu 'Ubayd al-Juzjani, Persian physician (d. 1070)
 Adalbero, German nobleman (approximate date)
 Avicenna, Persian polymath (approximate date)
 Baldwin IV (the Bearded), French nobleman (d. 1035)
 Bardo, German abbot and archbishop (approximate date)
 Benedict VIII, pope of the Catholic Church (d. 1024)
 Einar Thambarskelfir, Norwegian nobleman (d. 1050)
 Ekkehard IV, Swiss chronicler (approximate date)
 Farrukhi Sistani, Persian poet (approximate date)
 Geoffrey I, French nobleman (d. 1008)
 Herman I, German nobleman (approximate date)
 Humbert I, founder of the House of Savoy (approximate date)
 Pope Nicholas II, pope of the Catholic Church (d. 1061) 
 Olof Skötkonung, king of Sweden (approximate date)
 Otto III, Holy Roman Emperor (d. 1002)
 Sviatopolk I, Grand Prince of Kiev (approximate date)
 Tancred of Hauteville, Norman nobleman (d. 1041)
 Theodora Porphyrogenita, Byzantine empress (d. 1056)
 Xuedou Chongxian, Chinese Buddhist monk (d. 1052)

Deaths 
 February 15 – Berthold, German nobleman (approximate date)
 September 28 – Minamoto no Hiromasa, Japanese nobleman (b. 918)
 Dado (or Dodon), Italian nobleman (approximate date)
 Domnall ua Néill (or Donal O'Neill), High King of Ireland 
 Eoghan Ua Cathain, abbot of Clonfert (Ireland)
 Gunnhild, Norwegian Viking queen (approximate date)
 Ibn Khalawayh, Persian scholar and grammar (or 981)
 Liu Chang, emperor of Southern Han (b. 942)
 Yaropolk I, Grand Prince of Kiev (approximate date)

References